The Birksgate Range is a scattered range of mountains in the northwest of South Australia. The northern portion of it is located within the Watarru Indigenous Protected Area. The range consists of scattered protrusions of granitic rock that have been weathered into rounded and rugged hills. They are not visibly connected to each other, with each outcrop being separated by flat expanses of plains and sand dunes. The mountains are fairly low in elevation; they are highest at the northern end.

The most prominent peaks in the range are Mounts Lindsay and Wooltarlinna, at the northeastern end of the range, near Watarru. Further southwest are Mounts Holder and Sir Thomas. From here the range spreads southeast along the edge of the desert, and the hills generally become lower and more widely dispersed. Mount Poondinna is the highest peak in the central part of the range. Mounts Cheesman and Yaroona (also spelled Yaruna) are further to the southeast. The southern end of the range is at Iltur (Coffin Hill).

The Birksgate Range was named by the explorer David Lindsay, who led the Elder Scientific Exploring Expedition across the Great Victoria Desert between April 1891 and March 1892. He named the range for the man who funded and equipped their expedition, Sir Thomas Elder. "Birksgate" was the name of Elder's house in Adelaide.

References

Mountain ranges of South Australia
Far North (South Australia)